Beaus$Eros (pronounced "bows & arrows") is a studio album by American rapper Busdriver. It was released on Fake Four Inc. in 2012.

Critical reception

At Metacritic, which assigns a weighted average score out of 100 to reviews from mainstream critics, the album received an average score of 62, based on 11 reviews, indicating "generally favorable reviews".

Thomas Quinlan of Exclaim! gave the album a favorable review, noting that "Belgian producer Loden mixes hip-hop, electronica, drum & bass, glitch-hop, synth rock, '80s pop and anything else he can get his hands on, often moving from one style to another within a single track." Brice Ezell of PopMatters gave the album 6 stars out of 10, saying: "While part of the beauty of Busdriver's work is the challenge it presents, much of Beaus$Eros isn't really challenging but instead confused."

Track listing

Personnel
Credits adapted from liner notes.

 Busdriver – vocals, production (2, 6)
 Loden – production, mixing
 Annabel Feeney – vocals (2)
 Miguel Atwood-Ferguson – strings (4)
 François Legrain – trumpet (8)
 Sierra Cassidy – vocals (10)
 Mike Ladd – vocals (10)
 Joëlle Lê – vocals (10), inside panel photography
 Giovanni Oduber – guitar (11)
 Rory McCartney – image
 Michael Crigler – design

References

Further reading

External links
 
 

2012 albums
Busdriver albums
Fake Four Inc. albums